The Giant Minutes to the Dawn is an album by Leaether Strip. Some editions of the album included the bonus EP The Hourglass.

Track listing
 "Will the Sun Return?"	
 "Dirty Little Secret"
 "Sedated Nation"
 "Commotio"
 "The Trouble"
 "Go Ahead"
 "Caught in the Headlights"
 "Kill the Predator"
 "Blah Blah Blah"
 "Crucify Them"
 "This Age of Neglect"
 "Seconds Last Forever"
 "Annie"

References

Leæther Strip albums
2007 albums